Luigi Zappelli (1 January 1886 – 9 August 1948) was an Italian politician who served as Mayor of Verbania (1946–1948), member of the Constituent Assembly (1946–1948) and Deputy (1948).

References

1886 births
1948 deaths
Mayors of Verbania
Deputies of Legislature I of Italy
20th-century Italian politicians
Italian Socialist Party politicians